The King's Highway is a 1927 British romantic adventure film directed by Sinclair Hill and starring James Carew, Gerald Ames, Matheson Lang and Joan Lockton. The film follows the romance and escapades of an eighteenth-century English highwaymen.

Cast
 Matheson Lang as Paul Clifford 
 Joan Lockton as Lucy Brandon 
 James Carew as James Brandon 
 Gerald Ames as Lord Maulveren 
 Mark Lupino as Old Baggs 
 Henry Latimer as Gentleman George 
 Sydney Seaward as Augustus 
 Frank Goldsmith as Squire John Brandon 
 Clifford Heatherley as Beau Nash 
 Nell Emerald as Lizzie Lob 
 Aubrey Fitzgerald as Nathaniel 
 George Butler as Long Ned 
 Frederick Ranalow as MacHeath 
 Wally Patch as Police Chief

References

Bibliography
 Low, Rachael. History of the British Film, 1918-1929. George Allen & Unwin, 1971.

External links

1927 films
1920s historical adventure films
British crime films
1920s crime films
British historical adventure films
British silent feature films
Stoll Pictures films
Films set in the 18th century
Films set in England
Films shot at Cricklewood Studios
British black-and-white films
Films directed by Sinclair Hill
1920s British films
Silent historical adventure films